The Drinker is a novel by German writer Hans Fallada, first published posthumously in 1950.

Fallada began the novel in 1944, when he was imprisoned in a criminal asylum for the attempted murder of his wife. It is autobiographical, in diary form, and tells the story of a man in the grip of alcohol. Beryl Bainbridge called it "both shocking and original".  Fallada wrote the manuscript in code, so as to encrypt the contents of the manuscript against detection by asylum staff and officials.

References

1950 German novels
German-language novels
Novels by Hans Fallada
Novels published posthumously